SHCP may mean: 

Sacred Heart Cathedral Preparatory, a co-ed Catholic school in San Francisco, California
Secretaría de Hacienda y Crédito Público, Mexico's Secretariat of Finance and Public Credit